Joseph Treffle Rosario "Kitoute" Joannette (July 27, 1916  – October 9, 1998) was a Canadian retired professional ice hockey forward who played 2 games in the National Hockey League for the Montreal Canadiens.

Born in Valleyfield, Quebec, Joannette was a centerman and right winger and spent most of his playing days with the Valleyfield Braves. Joanette was a prolific goal scorer and routinely netted 20 goals-plus per season. In 1944-45, the same season he played his two games with Montreal Canadiens, Joanette led the QPHL with 45 goals, 56 assists, and 101 points in just 37 games.

In Joanette's 2 regular season contests with the Montreal Canadiens, he registered just 1 assist.

External links
 

1916 births
1998 deaths
Baltimore Clippers (1945–49) players
Canadian ice hockey forwards
Ice hockey people from Quebec
Montreal Canadiens players
Sportspeople from Salaberry-de-Valleyfield